Kuhpayeh Sara (also Romanized as Kūhpāyeh Sarā; also known as Kūb Sarā) is a village in Sajjadrud Rural District, Bandpey-ye Sharqi District, Babol County, Mazandaran Province, Iran. At the 2006 census, its population was 804, in 187 families.

References 

Populated places in Babol County